The 2007 Geelong Football Club season was the club's 108th season in the Australian Football League (AFL). Geelong finished the regular season in first position on the ladder, earning the club its eighth McClelland Trophy.

News

Captains 
 Captain: Tom Harley
 Vice-Captain: Cameron Ling
 Deputy Vice-Captain: Cameron Mooney

Club List

Player List

Rookie List

Changes from 2006 List

Additions 
 Exchange period – received:
 None
 Rookie elevation:
 Father/son selection:
 Tom Hawkins

 NAB AFL Draft (25 November 2006):
 Joel Selwood (Round 1; Overall pick 7; from Bendigo Pioneers)
 Nathan Djerrkura (Round 2; Overall pick 25; from Wanderers Football Club)
 Tom Hawkins (Round 3; Overall pick 41; from Sandringham Dragons)
 Simon Hogan (Round 4; Overall pick 57; from Geelong Falcons)

 NAB AFL Pre-Season Draft:
 None
 NAB AFL Rookie Draft (13 December 2006):
 Joel Reynolds (Round 1; Overall pick 7; from )
 Liam Bedford (Round 2; Overall pick 23: from Claremont Football Club)
 Jason Davenport (Round 3; Overall pick 38; Geelong VFL)
 Tom Lonergan (Round 4; Overall pick 50; Redrafted as Rookie)

Deletions 
 Delisted:

 Retirements:
 Peter Riccardi

Games

Exhibition and Trial Games

NAB Cup

Premiership season

Finals

See also 
 2007 AFL Season
 Geelong Football Club

References

External links 
 Official Website of the Geelong Football Club
 Official Website of the Australian Football League 

2007 in Australian rules football
2007
2007 Australian Football League season